El Djoumhouria ( meaning 'The Republic') is a daily newspaper published six times a weeks (from Saturday to Thursday) in Oran, Algeria.

It was established by Pierre Lafont as a French language newspaper on 12 October 1844 as L'Écho d'Oran. In 1963, it was renamed La République and published for one year as a French daily newspaper, with the front page only in Arabic. In 1976, it became an all-Arabic daily.

External links
Official website

Arabic-language newspapers
Publications established in 1844
Newspapers published in Algeria